Germany has the largest outbound tourist trade in the world, with Germans spending about €80 billion annually to travel abroad (the United States is second), in spite of Germany being fourth in world in GDP and fourteenth in population. Germany also has the eighth largest inbound tourist trade, with receipts of around €24 billion.

Inbound tourism

The German National Tourist Board is the primary organ for developing and managing inbound tourism (tourists visiting Germany).

Outbound tourism
The German Travel Association (DRV) is the umbrella association for developing and managing outbound tourism (tourists from Germany visiting other countries).

DRV represents the interests of small, mid-sized and large companies in the travel industry vis-à-vis German, European and international policy makers and vis-à-vis service providers from Germany and abroad. It informs the public about the claimed advantages of tour operator travel and travel industry offers.

Furthermore, DRV supports cultural diversity and environmental issues. Other core tasks are market research and advising members on travel and competition laws as well as on standard terms and conditions. DRV provides its members with information on tax issues, sales models and on special topics like financial management and information technology. Training opportunities such as workshops and seminars are offered continuously to DRV members.

DRV Service GmbH is a subsidiary of DRV and has its registered office in Berlin. Its various tasks include the staging of meetings, congresses, seminars, workshops and road shows as well as publishing of a series of textbooks, studies and reference works for the travel industry.

See also
Tourism in Germany

References

External links
 DRV Homepage German version
 DRV Homepage English version 

Tourism in Germany